The 1857 New Hampshire gubernatorial election was held on March 10, 1857.

Incumbent Know Nothing Governor Ralph Metcalf did not stand for re-election.

Republican nominee William Haile defeated Democratic nominee John S. Wells with 51.93% of the vote.

General election

Major candidates
William Haile, Republican, former President of the New Hampshire Senate
John S. Wells, Democratic, former U.S. Senator, Democratic nominee for Governor in 1856

Minor candidate
Charles Brickett Haddock, Whig

Results

Notes

References

1857
New Hampshire
Gubernatorial